Vertiskos, known before 1927 as Berovo (Μπέροβο), is a village a community and a former municipality in the Thessaloniki regional unit, Greece. Since the 2011 local government reform it is part of the municipality Lagkadas, of which it is a municipal unit. The 2011 census recorded 343 people in the village, 394 people in the community and 1,923 people in the municipal unit of Vertiskos. The community of Vertiskos covers an area of 46.629 km2 while the respective municipal unit covers an area of 196.613 km2.

Administrative division
The municipal unit of Vertiskos comprises four communities:
 Exalofos
 Lofiskos
 Ossa
 Vertiskos

The community of Vertiskos consists of two separate settlements: 
Chorouda (population 51)
Vertiskos (population 343)
The aforementioned population figures are as of 2011.

Name and history
The name of the municipality Vertiskos came from the village Vertiskos, which means "The green" in Latin. The old name of Vertiskos was "Berva". The village Vertiskos was built in the end of the 1600. The people in Vertiskos speaks only Greek, and they have retained some of their old customs. The village Vertiskos in the 1900s was a developed society. They had their own electricity and manufactories. Vertiskos workers built a trade union in the beginning of 1900 which was unique among the Balkan region. This union together with other cultural organisations in Vertiskos organised cultural and political activities. After the civil war in Greece, the village was disintegrated. Today Vertiskos has only about 100 permanent residents.
The summer school for classical music which existed many years is closed today and has been replaced by a series of seminars about the environment for students and teachers.

See also
 List of settlements in the Thessaloniki regional unit

References

Populated places in Thessaloniki (regional unit)